John Glenn High School is a public high school in Walkerton, Indiana. It is the only high school in the John Glenn School Corporation, which serves Walkerton and North Liberty.

John Glenn High School is a member of the North Central Association of Colleges and Schools (N.C.A.). Credits earned at John Glenn High School are accepted by all high schools and colleges in Indiana and by all schools that are members of the N.C.A. John Glenn has a First Class commissioned rating from the Indiana Department of Public Instruction.

The school was dedicated on October 20, 1968, with NASA astronaut John Glenn, for whom it is named, present.  Glenn is said to have delivered an inspiring speech on the occasion.

Glenn has won 18 state spell bowl competitions.

The school's predecessor was Walkerton High School, whose first building was constructed in 1914 and housed all twelve grades.  Then in 1942 a new building was constructed and the high school relocated there.  When the Glenn school was constructed and occupied, the existing high school building was repurposed as the Harold C. Urey Middle School.

Academics

John Glenn is given a score of 7/10 on greatschools.org. The school has scored higher than the state averages on the End-of-Course-Assessments given by the state of Indiana.

The student-teacher ratio is slightly larger than the state average at 20 (Indiana average is 17) Source: 1NCES, 2008-2009

John Glenn offers 13 AP and college-credit courses including :
 Calculus AB
 Chemistry
 English Literature & Composition
 Government & Politics: U.S.
 Physics B

John Glenn offers the following foreign languages:
Spanish
French
Chinese

Student Demographics

The ethnic make-up of John Glenn is as follows: (State Averages in parentheses)

White - 92% (73%)

Hispanic - 5% (8%)

Multiracial - 2% (4%)

Black, non-Hispanic - >1% (12%)

Asian - >1% (2%)

Native American - >1% (>1%)

Source: IN Dept. of Education, 2010-2011

Student Sub-groups

Students participating in free or reduced-price lunch program - 31% (47%)

English learners - <1%	(5%)

Special education - 7%	(15%)

Student Activities
The following is a list of clubs and activities available for John Glenn High School students. (Taken from the student handbook) 
 Academic Decathlon Team
 Drama Club
 Yearbook
 Aerial (literary magazine)
 Spanish Club 
 French Club 
 Spell Bowl Team 
 Art Club
 F.F.A.
 F.C.C.L.A.
 S.A.D.D.
 Student Council
 Chess Club
 Swing Choir 
 Jazz Band 
 Marching Band
 Concert Band 
 Color Guard

The school's literary magazine, The Aerial, was nominated for the highest award in Indiana, but ended up finishing second.

Athletics
John Glenn High School's athletic teams are the Falcons and they are part of the Northern Indiana Athletic Conference in the IHSAA.  (In the era of the 1950s and thereabouts the teams were known as the Walkerton Indians.)  The school is currently athletic rivals with the inter-conference team Bremen Lions of Bremen High School in Bremen. The Falcons were formerly rivals with the North Liberty Shamrocks; however, this rivalry ended after the two schools merged.

The school offers a wide range of athletics including:
 Baseball
 Softball
 football
 Basketball 
 Volleyball
 Golf
 Tennis
 Soccer
 Track and field
 Cross Country

Notable alumni 

 Barry L. Houser - band director, current director of the University of Illinois Marching Illini
Marci Miller - actress and model, known for portraying Abigail Deveraux on the NBC soap opera Days of Our Lives

See also
 List of high schools in Indiana

References

External links
 Official website
 John Glenn School Corporation

Public high schools in Indiana
Schools in St. Joseph County, Indiana
1968 establishments in Indiana